Nishio (written: 西尾) is a Japanese surname. Notable people with the surname include:

, Japanese shogi player
, Japanese animator and director
, Japanese singer, actress and model
, Japanese film director, animator and writer
, Japanese academic
Linda Nishio (born 1952), Japanese-American artist
, Japanese actress
, Japanese politician
, Japanese footballer
, Japanese aikidoka
, Japanese computer scientist
, Japanese daimyō
, Japanese daimyō
, Japanese daimyō
, Japanese daimyō
, Japanese daimyō
, Japanese daimyō
, Japanese daimyō
, Japanese daimyō
, Japanese daimyō
, Japanese animator and character designer
, Japanese actor and voice actor
, Japanese general

Japanese-language surnames